Murderer in the Fog is a 1964 West German crime film directed by Eugen York and starring Hansjörg Felmy, Ingmar Zeisberg and Elke Arendt. The police investigate a series of attacks in a small German town.

The film's sets were designed by the art director Karl Schneider. The film was partly shot on location in Baden-Württemberg.

Cast
 Hansjörg Felmy as Kommissar Hauser
 Ingmar Zeisberg as Hilde Kment
 Elke Arendt as Franziska Hillebrand
 Ralph Persson as Heinz Auer
 Wolfgang Völz as Kriminalassistent Kurt Freitag
 Wolfgang Büttner as Schuldirektor Dr. Hillebrand
 Alfred Balthoff as Herr Lindemann
 Karl-Georg Saebisch as Herr Auer
 Berta Drews as Frau Ritzel
 Marlene Warrlich as Ulla Reiter
 Hilde Sessak as Frau Schmittner
 Isabelle Carlson as Gerda Brinkmann
 Elfriede Rückert as Frau Ambacher
 Addi Adametz as Krankenschwester
 Lutz Hochstraate as Erwin Lindemann
 Jürgen Janza as Franz Ritzel (as Hans Jürgen Janza)
 Wolfgang Jansen as Robert Elsen
 Rolf Stahl as Willi Wolfsberger
 Werner Schulenberg as Bert Steiner
 Günter Meisner as Kriminalassistent Behrend
 Benno Hoffmann as Komarek
 Herbert Knippenberg as Kriminalassistent Neuhaus
 Horst-Werner Loos as Kriminalassistent Betzinger
 Hannes Tannert as Herr Elsen
 Nikolaus Schilling as Ludwig Leitner
 Ursula van der Wielen as Barbara Freitag

References

Bibliography 
 Bock, Hans-Michael & Bergfelder, Tim. The Concise CineGraph. Encyclopedia of German Cinema. Berghahn Books, 2009.

External links 
 

1964 films
1964 crime films
German crime films
West German films
1960s German-language films
Films directed by Eugen York
1960s German films